Sirisena Wimalaweera (born 23 June 1901 – died 24 August 1963) was a Sri Lankan filmmaker and theater master. He made several critically acclaimed films from 1949 to 1960. He is the first independent Sinhalese and Sri Lankan to direct a Sinhala film and first Sinhala Independent Producer.

Personal life
Wimalaweera was born on 23 June 1901 in Tangalle. He was a man of good knowledge about different languages such as Bengali, Gujarati, Hindi, Urdu, etc. At the age of eleven, he traveled to India with his uncle to study Ayurvedic medicine. But, unfortunately, he got the idea of doing drama. He has two daughters - Somawathi and Premawathi; and three sons, Daya, Upasena and Ranjith. His elder son Daya Wimalaweera was a popular film director, cameraman, script writer and also a producer. Upesena Wimalaweera is also a sound engineer and editor.

Wimalaweera was rushed to the Khalil Private Hospital in Maradana and was 62 years old when he died on August 24, 1963.

Career
Wimalaweera came back to Sri Lanka and did many dramas and Wimalaweera went to the Neptune studio in South India on November 19, 1948 and spent eight months producing his first film Amma in 1949. His second feature Seedevi was produced the following year. He directed many stage plays such as Gan Wathura, Seedevi, Amma, Rodi Kella and Heladiva Purangana.

He continued his film career by directing many films such as Pitisera Kella and Saradeyal in 1954, Podi Putha in 1955, Asoka in 1957, Ekamath Eka Rataka in 1958, Ma Alaya Kala Tharuniya in 1959, and many more.

He also received an award for best film Podi Putha in 1956 as well as the film was critically acclaimed as his best film. He himself introduced many actors and singers too. Podiputha won the award for the Best Film at the 1956 Deepashika Film Festival. He directed the first film in Sri Lanka with cartoons, Ekamath Eka Rataka in 1958. His 1955 film Asoka was the only Sinhala film to screened in China according to "Motion Picture" magazine. His film Ma Ale Kala Tharuniya was adjudged the best movie of the year at the 1959 cinema's edited by Jayawilal Wilegoda. In 1960, Wimalaweera started the film Punchi Amma and introduced Tony Ranasinghe into the silver screen. In the meantime, Wimalaweera has started the film Rodi Kella and has selected Sandya Kumari for the first time to play the lead role. This film also marked Premasiri Khemadasa's first musical directorial debut.

Wimalaweera's films attempted to stay true to Sinhala history and culture and are considered a step forward in Sinhala cinema. Due to his indefatigable efforts a film studio named "Nawajeewana" was built in Kirobathgoda, Kelaniya which was established on 13 September 1951, which is known as the only studio owned by a Sri Lankan filmmaker. His style and techniques were similar to Jayamanne's work however and Wimalaweera didn't receive critical approval.

Filmography

As director

As lyricist

References

External links
 ලංකාවේ ප්‍රථම වර්ණ සිංහල චිත්‍රපටය ගම්බද සුන්දරී
 ලෙස්‌ටර්ගේ සිනමා භාවිතය ඔහුගේම ආත්ම කථනයක්‌
 විමලවීර කෝකියාගේ සිංහල කිරිහොදි සිනමාව

Sri Lankan film directors
1901 births
1963 deaths